Nosotros is a political party in Guatemala.

History
The political party was founded in 2020 by Rudy Guzmán and his wife Nadia de León Torres. The party was registered by the Supreme Electoral Tribunal in May 2022.

Nadia de León Torres is the daughter of former First Lady Sandra Torres, and member of the Central American Parliament for the National Unity of Hope since 2020 and she was President of the Central American Parliament.

The political party describes itself as "independent" of Sandra Torres and the National Unity of Hope, although at that time they did not rule out forming a coalition with the UNE in 2023 general election.

On 22 January 2023, Nosotros nominated party leader Rudy Guzmán as presidential candidate, and Diego González, a member of Congress for Vamos, as Vice Presidential candidate.

Deputies Carlos Mencos and Petrona Mejía, elected by the National Unity of Hope in 2019 will opt for re-election by the PPN.

Election results

President of the Republic of Guatemala

Congress of the Republic

References

External links

2020 establishments in Guatemala
Political parties established in 2020
Political parties in Guatemala